Taftan Airlines is an airline from Iran.

History
The airline was founded in 2004 and commenced operations the same year. It ceased operations in 2006 and launched again in 2014, only to cease operations the next year. For the third time, the airline launched operations in August 2016.

The airline has its main hub at the Zahedan Airport. Its fleet comprises six Fokker 50, one MD-82 and one MD-83 aircraft.

Fleet

See also
 List of airlines of Iran

References 

Airlines of Iran
Airlines established in 2004
Iranian companies established in 2004